The Pittsburgh Ballet Theatre (PBT) is an American professional ballet company based in the Strip District of Pittsburgh, Pennsylvania (USA).

History

1969 - Founding

The Pittsburgh Ballet Theatre was founded in 1969 by a Yugoslavian choreographer, Founding Artistic Director Nicolas Petrov, and an arts advocate, Founding Board Chair Loti Falk. They initially met at an outdoor ballet performance featuring Petrov's Pittsburgh Playhouse dancers. Both believed that ballet would enrich the city's cultural community and satisfy a thirst for diverse performing arts opportunities on par with other major metro areas. Despite ballet's novelty in Pittsburgh, the movement resonated with onlookers. It also secured a pledge of support from Falk. According to Petrov, “the development of the Pittsburgh Ballet Theatre pivoted on that promise.” Together, they went on to found the Pittsburgh Ballet Theatre in 1969 in affiliation with Point Park College. As Founding Artistic Director, Petrov brought artistic connections, a rich choreographic background and a corps of young talent from the dance programs he developed at the Pittsburgh Playhouse and Point Park College. As Founding Chair, benefactor and full-time volunteer, Falk gave wings to the company with the irrepressible energy and ambition that continue to define the PBT work ethic. The legacy was born.

1970s

In the 1970s, the Pittsburgh Ballet Theatre proved its staying power. Following its 1969 stage debut at the Pittsburgh Playhouse, PBT sold out its inaugural 1970-71 subscription season, featuring Petrov's The Nutcracker and Swan Lake. In 1971 Loti and Leon Falk purchased PBT's first studio space on the Boulevard of the Allies. In these formative years, the founders flexed their connections in the elite circles of American ballet to bring seminal performers of the era, including Natalia Makarova, Edward Villella and Violette Verdy, to guest star in PBT productions. Luminaries like Leonide Massine and Frederic Franklin came to Pittsburgh to stage ballets, instruct master classes and help shape the fledgling company. By the end of the decade, PBT had cleared fiscal hurdles, become independent of Point Park College and withstood an artistic transition. When Petrov stepped down to focus on the Point Park program, John Gilpin, of London’s Festival Ballet, briefly led the company until Patrick Frantz, a former Paris Opera Ballet dancer, took the helm in 1978. The Company closed the decade with a symbol of the future: the establishment of Pittsburgh Ballet Theatre School in 1979.

Repertoire Highlights: Cinderella, Coppélia, Giselle, Petrov's Steel Symphony, Frederic Franklin’s Les Sylphides, George Balanchine’s The Prodigal Son

Defining Moments of the 70s

1980s

As it entered its second decade, Pittsburgh Ballet Theatre cemented its place among the nation's leading ballet companies. By the 1981-82 Season, PBT had made its New York City debut and toured to 28 states, Canada and the Virgin Islands. In 1982, PBT entered a new era with the appointment of Patricia Wilde as artistic director – a position she would hold for 15 years. The former New York City Ballet principal invigorated the dancers with her refined technique and the works of modern masters, including her mentor, George Balanchine. In addition to Balanchine masterworks, PBT took on full-length classics like Don Quixote and premiered the first ballet rendition of The Great Gatsby. With an eye toward the future, the company launched PBT School's first Intensive Summer Program and established the Schenley Program for high school students who needed to balance academic and artistic studies. In 1984, Loti and Leon Falk gifted the company with its current Liberty Avenue studios and a new home for both the company and school.

Repertoire Highlights: Andre Prokovsky’s The Great Gatsby; George Balanchine’s Theme and Variations, Western Symphony and The Four Temperaments; Paul Taylor’s Sunset; Agnes de Mille’s Rodeo

Defining Moments of the 80s

1990s

The company's repertoire continued to diversify in the 1990's as PBT explored new artistic ground. Throughout her tenure, Patricia Wilde cultivated emerging choreographers and commissioned a total of 32 works. The company also premiered an original new story ballet, the baseball classic, The Mighty Casey, choregraphed by Lisa DeRibere. In 1997, Terrence Orr was hired as Artistic Director. A former ABT principal dancer, Orr had visited the Company in the 80's to set Rodeo and other works from the ABT repertory. Orr also brought a vision shaped by some of the nation's leading ballet companies and a strong gift for storytelling. He continued building the repertoire with new full-length story ballets, original works and artistic collaborations.

Repertoire Highlights: Lisa de Ribere's The Mighty Casey; George Balanchine’s Square Dance, Concerto Barrocco, Serenade, and Jewels; Indigo in Motion, Kent Stowell’s Carmina Burana

Defining Moments of the 90s

2000s

As PBT moved into the millennium, the company continued to draw inspiration from its hometown while stretching the city’s conception of classical ballet. In 2000, Orr in conjunction with Libman, began a series of commissions for contemporary ballets inspired by American music, including such artists as: Ray Brown, Stanley Turrentine, Lena Horne, Billy Strayhorn, Sting, Bruce Springsteen and Paul Simon. In 2002, Orr premiered his Pittsburgh-inspired production of The Nutcracker, engaging artists with a new creative endeavor and audiences with a production set in their city. In addition to modern masters like Twyla Tharp and Paul Taylor, the company commissioned works by rising choreographer Dwight Rhoden and ballets merging mainstream American music with classically based choreography. While PBT continued to celebrate legacy classics like Giselle, it also entered new dramatic territory with Jean-Christophe Maillot’s unconventional Roméo et Juliette and the evocative Light / The Holocaust and Humanity Project.

Orr would go on to commission 18 world premiere works for the company. Meanwhile, a successful “Say it with Music Campaign” to restore the PBT Orchestra would jump-start a growing period of financial stability for continued artistic growth.

Repertoire Highlights: Jean-Christophe Maillot’s Roméo et Juliette; Stephen Mills’ Light / The Holocaust and Humanity Project; Paul Taylor’s Company B; Twyla Tharp’s In the Upper Room, Known by Heart (Junk Duet) and Octet; Derek Deane’s Alice in Wonderland

Defining Moments of the 2000s

TODAY

Nearly 50 years later, the founders’ legacy stands strong. PBT has evolved into a critically acclaimed company with international reach. Today, the company ranks among the five largest performing arts organizations in Pittsburgh and is home to 30 full-time dancers, who come from 12 states and six countries to live and perform in Pittsburgh. Sharing the same studio space, PBT School cultivates the next generation of professional dancers, who come to PBT from around the country — and the world — to train with its world-renowned instructors and artists. PBT also offers great deal in the community such as Youth Scholarship Program to young aspiring talents. Together with the PBT Orchestra under Maestro Charles Barker, PBT encompasses a rich family of dancers and musicians. Through more than 50 performances each year at home and on tour, PBT stays true to the vision of its founders: to perpetuate joy and excellence in ballet.

Repertoire Highlights: John Neumeier’s A Streetcar Named Desire; Mark Morris’ Drink to Me Only with Thine Eyes, Maelstrom, and Sandpaper Ballet; Jiří Kylián's Petite Mortand Sinfonietta; Jerome Robbins’ The Concert; Jorden Morris’ Peter Pan and Moulin Rouge®–The Ballet; La Bayadère; Le Corsaire; Original works by PBT company dancers

Defining Moments:

'''Notable Former Principal Dancers

Steven Annegarn
Laura Desire
Ying Li
Stanko Milov (1993-1999) Official Website
Jaibin Pan
Willie Shives

Dancers

Principal dancers 
As of December 2020 :
 Hannah Carter
 Amanda Cochrane
 Alexandra Kochis
 Alejandro Diaz
 Yoshiaki Nakano

Soloists 
As of December 2020:
 Jessica McCann
 Gabrielle Thurlow
 Masahiro Haneji
 Diana Yohe
 JoAnna Schmidt
 William Moore
 Corey Bourbonniere
 Marisa Grywalski
 Tommie Kesten
 Lucius Kirst

Corps de Ballet 
As of December 2020:
 Danielle Downey
 Jonathan Breight
 Amanda Potts
 Christian Garcia Campos
 Victoria Watford
 Joseph Parr
 Kurtis Sprowls
 Cooper Verona
 Colin Mccaslin
 Caitlyn Mendicino
 Jack Hawn
 Allison Durand
 Grace Rookstool
 Sam DerGregorian
 Erin Casale
 Josiah Kaufmann

Pittsburgh Ballet Theatre School 

PBT launched its first comprehensive arts education program in 1989 with a seed grant from the Henry C. Frick Educational Commission. In its first year the program reached 6000 children. Since that time, PBT has reached more than 65,000 children from over 200 school districts in a four-state region.

PBT School enrolls more than 1,000 students annually across its Children's, Student, Pre-professional and Community divisions. The Pre-professional Division, which cultivates the next generation of professional dancers, includes both part-time and full-time high school programs for students who are balancing academic studies with career-track ballet training. The curriculum includes technique, pointe or men's technique, partnering, jazz, character and Pilates classes. The Graduate Program provides advanced training to high school graduates who are preparing to audition for professional positions. While the Grad students continue with similar technique classes as students in the High School Program, they concentrate more on learning and rehearsing repertoire. Graduates of PBT School can be found in the rosters of professional companies nationwide and in the ranks of PBT's own professional company.

The school presents two student productions each spring: Pre-Professional Showcases at Point Park University's intimate George Rowland White Performance Studio and Spring Performance, which features 200+ dancers of the Student and Pre-professional divisions onstage at the Byham Theater in downtown Pittsburgh. Students also have the opportunity to audition for and perform in PBT's main-stage productions, especially "The Nutcracker."

The dancers who attended PBT School and are now dancing at different ballets across the world are:

2009-2010

 Amanda Whites, Dance Theatre of Tennessee
 Kristie Latham, Ballet Met (Trainee)
 Olivia Kelly, Pittsburgh Ballet Theatre
 Katie Miller, Sacramento Ballet (Apprentice)
 Molly Wright, Pittsburgh Ballet Theatre
 Becca Cross, Rochester City Ballet
 Ava Chatterson, Sacramento Ballet
 Kelly Ford, Sacramento Ballet (Apprentice)
 Jordan Richardson, Nevada Ballet Theater
 Shanna Gayer, University of Pittsburgh
 Meghan Wright, Sacramento Ballet
 Amber Runyan, North Carolina Dance Theater (Trainee)
 Christina Gratton, Boston University
 Caitlin Mayes, University of Texas
 Ted Henderson, Pittsburgh Ballet Theatre
 Erik Johnson, Rochester City Ballet
 Yoshiaki Nakano, Pittsburgh Ballet Theatre
 Anna Porter, Columbia City Ballet

2008-2009

 Elizabeth Ashbaugh, Louisville Ballet (Apprentice)
 Amanda Cochrane, Pittsburgh Ballet Theatre (Apprentice)
 Ashley Hamman, Ballet Quad Cities
 Caitlin McElroy, Atlantic City Ballet (Apprentice)
 Benjamin Rabe, Rochester City Ballet
 Amanda Radetzky, Victoria Ballet
 Kelsey Schneider, Rochester City Ballet (Apprentice)
 Casey Taylor, Pacific Northwest Ballet (Professional Division)
 Benjamin Tucker, Richmond Ballet (Apprentice)
 Kirsten Wipperfeld, Richmond Ballet (Trainee)
 Carissa Chandler*, Pittsburgh Ballet Theatre (retired/injured)

2007-2008

 Steven Bain, Ballet Idaho
 Sonja Davenport, Cincinnati Ballet (Trainee)
 Devon Darrow, Richmond Ballet (Trainee)
 Kelly Jarrell, Pittsburgh Ballet Theatre (Apprentice)
 Corynn Miller, Rochester City Ballet (Apprentice)
 Joseph Parr, Pittsburgh Ballet Theatre
 Patrick Yokum, Boston Ballet II
 Jessica Wheeler, Louisville Ballet (Trainee)

2006-2007

 Gauen Alexander, Alabama Ballet
 Alexis Antolic, Louisville Ballet
 Kaleb Baker, Ballet Quad Cities
 Kelsey Bartman, Texture Ballet
 Allison Debona, Ballet West
 Patrick DesRosiers, Ballet Quad Cities
 Danielle Downey, Pittsburgh Ballet Theatre
 Sasha Edelman, Ballet Arizona
 Laurie Lou Garside, Richmond Ballet (Apprentice)
 Alana Gergerich, Omaha Theater Ballet
 Shannon Hokanson, Louisville Ballet (Trainee)
 Temple Kemezis, Connecticut Ballet
 Emily Long, Ballet Quad Cities
 Gabrielle Thurlow, Pittsburgh Ballet Theatre
 Brittany Waggy, Ballet Quad Cities
 Kelly Walsh, Alabama Ballet
 Ashley Wegman, Pittsburgh Ballet Theatre
 Aleksandr York, Omaha Theater Ballet

2005-2006

 Edward Carr, Ballet Austin
 Nicholas Coppula, Pittsburgh Ballet Theatre
 Roberto Curti, Pittsburgh Ballet Theatre (Apprentice)
 Michelle Joy, Pittsburgh Ballet Theatre, Metropolitan Opera
 Kimberly Tasota, Pittsburgh Ballet Theatre
 Eva Trapp, Pittsburgh Ballet Theatre
 Brienne Wiltse, Pittsburgh Ballet Theatre

References

External links
Pittsburgh Ballet Theatre, official website

Ballet companies in the United States
Performing arts in Pittsburgh
1968 establishments in Pennsylvania
Performing groups established in 1968
Dance in Pennsylvania